The Shiderti (Şıdertı; in its lower course: Karasu) is a river of Kazakhstan.

Course
The river has its source under the name Sarapan in the central part of the Kazakh Uplands, northern part of Karaganda Region. It flows roughly northwestwards and discharges into lake Shaganak (Aktogay District). The Irtysh–Karaganda Canal runs along the Shiderti river in its upper and middle course flowing in the opposite direction.

See also
List of rivers of Kazakhstan

References

Rivers of Kazakhstan
West Siberian Plain